South Western Highway is a highway in the South West region of Western Australia connecting Perth's southeast with Walpole. It is a part of the Highway 1 network for most of its length.

Route description

Perth to Bunbury
From Perth, the highway, signed as State Route 20, starts from the Albany Highway junction in Armadale, 28 km from Perth, and follows a north–south route 20–30 km inland from the coast, passing through several agricultural and timber towns that sprang up in the 1890s when the nearby railway came through, such as Pinjarra, Waroona, Yarloop and Harvey.

In January 2016, the Samson Brook bridge, one of the highway bridges near Waroona, was damaged by a bushfire.

Just past Brunswick Junction, the highway heads southwest towards Western Australia's third-largest city, Bunbury. The typical scenery on this part of the highway includes small dairy farms and orchards, jarrah and marri remnant forests and pine plantations.

Until the 1980s, the Armadale-Bunbury section was part of National Highway 1, but following the upgrading of Old Coast Road and construction of the Mandurah bypass, Highway 1 now follows the coastal route via Kwinana Freeway and Old Coast Road to Bunbury passing through the resort town of Mandurah.

In Bunbury
The highway does not actually enter Bunbury – it stops at the industrial suburb of Picton, following Robertson Drive (Bunbury's ring road) for 1 km south before turning southeast past Bunbury Airport towards Boyanup. The highway actually used to follow what is now Boyanup-Picton Road from Picton via Dardanup, but changed to the present shorter route in the 1980s.

Bunbury to Walpole
From Bunbury, the highway goes through Boyanup and on to Donnybrook, the heart of WA's apple country. From then on the highway passes through thick forests featuring many native trees like jarrah, marri and karri. The region was settled much later than other parts of south western WA, under a soldier resettlement scheme beginning in 1919. Typical scenery is farmland interspersed with forests and small timber towns.

The highway then goes through Bridgetown (where it meets the Brockman Highway from Augusta and Nannup), Manjimup and finally to Walpole. This part of the highway, especially from Manjimup, is sparsely populated and very thickly forested, with abundant wildlife and wildflowers as well as many old growth trees, especially the giant karri.

From Walpole, the Highway 1 continues as South Coast Highway to Albany.

Major towns

 Armadale
 Byford
 Pinjarra
 Waroona
 Yarloop
 Harvey
 Brunswick Junction
 Bunbury
 Boyanup
 Donnybrook
 Bridgetown
 Manjimup
 Walpole

History
Following the establishment of the Swan River Colony, the earliest report of exploration of the district around what is now Bunbury is from Lieutenant H. W. Bunbury in December 1836. The route began with passage from Perth to Pinjarra, before turning south-west and passing through low, open scrubland, and subsequently a medium-timbered area with low marshes. The first river to cross was the Harvey River, which could only be forded by horses at a single point, near the river mouth. Continuing south-westward, the northern tip of Leschenault Estuary was reached, and its shores followed before curving around into Bunbury.

In an initial attempt to settle the area, the government declared the land open for pastoral settlement by ordinary settlers, but little progress was made. By 1840, the population was just fifty-three, and most of those were in or near Bunbury (then known as Port Leschenault). The settlement of Australind by the Western Australian Land Company in 1840–41 prompted the first real need for a good quality road to Perth. Throughout much of 1842, there was much debate and discussion over providing a new route to Bunbury. A coastal route from Fremantle had been proposed, while an alternative proposal published on 11 May 1842 was a new route from Pinjarra to Bunbury, via an upstream crossing of the Harvey River, where a bridge could easily be built. The coastal route would require a ferry to cross the Murray River's estuary, and did not go through Pinjarra, a significant settlement in the area; however, it would be shorter, had more water along the route, and did go through the village of Mandurah, with a population of twenty-nine people from six families.
During the winter of 1842, the existing route became impassable, and Clifton decided to undertake the creation of the proposed coastal route. He sent his company's men to clear the path and make a road.

By the second half of the nineteenth century, the importance of the coast road was diminishing. For most of its length, the road went through well-timbered, sandy limestone country of little value to agriculture, and settlers in the vicinity of the road were scarce. In contrast, settlements had spread and prospered in the foothills of the Darling Scarp, and on 1 July 1853, Colonial Secretary Frederick Barlee announced a new proposal for a Perth–Pinjarra–Bunbury route along the foothills, with a  width, mostly following the alignment of previous tracks. Between 1864 and 1876, two parties of convicts were involved in the making of the road.

A road from Bunbury to Boyanup, called the Blackwood Road, existed as early as 1864.
A bi-weekly mail route from Boyanup to Bridgetown via Preston, Balingup, and Greenbushes was established by 1891; it also extended further south to Balbarrup on a weekly basis.
Surveying of a direct Bridgetown–Albany route was requested in January 1871, so that an electric telegraph line could be established, but the government surveyors were overwhelmed by other work. Surveying of the route from Manjimup (south of Bridgetown, adjacent to Balbarrup) was undertaken in 1909 by Fred S. Brockman.

Following World War I, the government intended to settle returning servicemen in the far south-west of the state. To determine the public works required, a flying survey was undertaken. The route between Manjimup and Walpole (then known as Nornalup) was reported to be overgrown and impassable. The Public Works Department was tasked with clearing the route and forming a road, with works gradually progressing from  onwards. By October 1921, £16,000 had been spent on upgrading the dirt track to a formed and gravelled road, with works expected to be completed over the 1921–22 summer at a cost of £2,000.

The road from Bunbury through Bridgetown to Manjimup was improved in 1926, as one of the Main Road Board's first projects. The worst segments were identified for reconstruction, as part of an ongoing process to create a high-quality highway.

The name South Western Highway was suggested for the road from Armadale to Pemberton in 1940 by the Under-Secretary for Lands. The name was in common usage by March 1941, and in July 1941, the name was officially applied to "the main road from Armadale to Pemberton via Pinjarra, Harvey, Picton Junction, Boyanup, Donnybrook, Bridgetown and Manjimup". The northern end was at the Perth–Albany road in Armadale, and the southern end was at Brockman Street, Pemberton.

Major intersections

Armadale to Picton

Davenport to Walpole

See also

 Highways in Australia
 List of highways in Western Australia

Notes

References

External links

Highways and freeways in Perth, Western Australia
Highways in rural Western Australia
Highway 1 (Australia)
South West (Western Australia)